Platynota subtinae is a species of moth of the family Tortricidae. It is found in Venezuela, Bolivia and Paraguay.

The larvae have been reared from Gossypium species, but are suspected to be polyphagous.

References

Moths described in 2013
Platynota (moth)